MedStar National Rehabilitation Hospital in Washington D.C.
 National Rehabilitation Hospital (Dublin) in Ireland